The 2011–12 Israel State Cup (Gvia HaMedina) was the 73rd season of Israel's nationwide football cup competition and the 58th after the Israeli Declaration of Independence. It began on 2 September 2011, while the final was held in Ramat Gan Stadium on 15 May 2012.

The competition was won by Hapoel Tel Aviv, who had beaten Maccabi Haifa 2–1 in the final. With this victory, Hapoel Tel Aviv won the cup for the third year in a row, equalizing its own record of consecutive titles, set between 1937 and 1939.

By winning, Hapoel Tel Aviv qualified for the 2012–13 UEFA Europa League, entering in the Play-off round.

Calendar

Results

Seventh Round
The 16 winners from the previous round of the competition join the 16 Liga Leumit clubs in this stage of the competition. These matches were played on 3 and 4 January 2012.

Eighth Round
The 16 winners from the previous round of the competition join the 16 clubs from the Israeli Premier League in this stage of the competition. These matches were played on 7 and 8 February 2012.

Round of 16
The 16 winners of the previous round entered this stage of the competition. These matches took place on 20 and 21 March 2012.

Quarter-finals
The eight winners of the previous round entered this stage of the competition. These matches took place on 9 and 10 April 2012.

Semi-finals
The four winners of the previous round entered this stage of the competition. These matches took  place on 2 May 2012, in Ramat Gan Stadium.

Final

References

External links
 Israel Football Association website 

Israel State Cup
State Cup
Israel State Cup seasons